The New Democratic Front is a progressive political party in Botswana without parliamentary representation. Led by Dick Bayford, it split away from the Botswana National Front in 2003. It won 0.78% of the popular votes at the elections that followed. After its poor performance in the 2004 general elections, the party joined forces with Botswana's third largest party, the Botswana Congress Party.

Political parties in Botswana